Flensburg may refer to:

Places
Flensburg, a town in northern Germany
Flensburg station, serving Flensburg, Germany
Flensburg, Minnesota
Flensburg, Malmö - a neighborhood of Malmö, Sweden
Flensburg Fjord

Other
Flensburg government, the short-lived May 1945 Nazi government led by Karl Dönitz
Flensburg-Engelsby transmitter
Flensburg radar detector